Azzam Tamimi (sometimes spelled Azam Tamimi; born 1955, Hebron, West Bank) is a British-Palestinian Jordanian academic and political activist affiliated with the Muslim Brotherhood. He is currently a freelance presenter at Alhiwar TV Channel. He headed the Institute of Islamic Political Thought until 2008. Tamimi has written several books on Middle Eastern and Islamic politics, including "Power-Sharing Islam", "Islam and Secularism in the Middle East", Rachid Ghannouchi, Democrat within Islamism and Hamas: A History from Within.

Early life and education
Tamimi was born in 1955 and lived in Hebron in the Jordanian West Bank until he was seven, when his family moved to Kuwait. His father had fought against Israel.

After high school, Tamimi moved to London to attend college. In 1979, he received a Bachelor of Science degree in Combined Sciences from the University of Sunderland and a PhD in Political Theory from the University of Westminster in 1998.

Finsbury Park Mosque reformation
In 2005, Tamimi led a group of trustees in reforming the Finsbury Park Mosque, which was previously under the control of Abu Hamza al-Masri. The reformation of the mosque has widely been seen as successful.

Political positions

War on Terror
Tamimi has stated that the War on Terror launched by the United States and its allies in the wake of September 11 attacks is perceived by many in the Islamic world as a war on Islam. He accused the American President George W. Bush of attempting to stop terrorism through war, political oppression and violations of human rights, saying that this would not work and would instead have the opposite effect.

Israeli-Palestinian conflict
In 2004, Tamimi stated that as a Jordanian, he would never confer legitimacy upon Israel, "a state that is created on land robbed from my father, from my grandfather and from my mother". He also classifies Zionism as a racist ideology. Nonetheless, Tamimi favours talks between Hamas and Israel, believing that co-existence between Palestinians and Israel may be possible. He has stated that "peace may still be achieved by talking about how to co-exist." In elaboration, he has said that "Hamas would only agree to a negotiated settlement based on the idea of a hudna (longterm ceasefire). In reality, of course, that would mean recognising Israel will exist within agreed-upon borders for a given period of time. It does not, however, mean recognising that where Israel sits is no longer Palestinian".  For the long run, Tamimi advocates what he calls a post-apartheid South African solution, in which Israel "is dissolved just like apartheid was, and all people within mandatory Palestine become equal citizens".

Tamimi was born in the Jordanian West Bank and moved away from the area when he was 7 year old. As such, he is a Jordanian by birthright.

In January 2006, Tamimi wrote that if Israel withdrew from territories occupied in 1967, Hamas would end its armed resistance.

Shortly before the invasion of the Gaza Strip by Israel in late 2008, Tamimi argued for continuation of a truce that had been maintained for five months between Hamas and Israel and for ending what he described as a siege placed upon Gaza by Israel.

Martyrdom
In November 2004, while being interviewed for the BBC programme Hardtalk, Tamimi said that sacrificing his life for justice for Palestine would be "a noble cause. It is the straight way to pleasing my God and I would do it if I had the opportunity".

On 28 February 2012, Tamimi appeared at a Palestinian event at Queen Mary, University of London. Tamimi said: "I’d be a martyr for my country, of course", adding that "if you’re not prepared to die for your country, then you are not a patriot".

References

External links
UK foreign policy under spotlight, Expoislamia in Manchester's MEN Arena.
Articles by Azzam Tamimi
UK police to investigate Muslim scholar's call for martyrdom, The Jerusalem Post, 23 August 2006.

1955 births
Living people
British Muslims
Palestinian emigrants to the United Kingdom
Palestinian Muslim Brotherhood members
Palestinian Muslims
People from Hebron
British activists
Alumni of the University of Sunderland
Alumni of the University of Westminster